John II of Nuremberg ( 1309 – 1357) was a Burgrave of Nuremberg from the House of Hohenzollern. He was the elder son of Frederick IV of Nuremberg and Margarete of Görz.

Life
He succeeded his father in 1332. He attained his name "the Acquirer" (German: der Erwerber) by the increase of the Frankish house possession of the Hohenzollern. From determining meaning the acquisition of the castle Plassenburg in Kulmbach with the county of Kulmbach by the contract of inheritance which became effective with the extinction of the present owners, the counts of Orlamünde in 1340. In the time of his government, came the outbreak of the plague, which claimed numerous victims in Nuremberg. Because the Jewish population was held responsible for the epidemic, numerous Nuremberg Jews were murdered, without the burgrave intervening against it.

Family and children
He married countess Elisabeth of Henneberg, daughter of Berthold VII, Count of Henneberg-Schleusingen, before 3 March 1333. Their children were:
 Frederick V, Burgrave of Nuremberg (before 3 March 1333 – 21 January 1398).
 Margarete (died 1377), married in 1359, Landshut, to Duke Stephen II, Duke of Bavaria.
 Elisabeth (died ca 1383), married 1360, to Ulrich, Count of Schaunberg.
 Anna (died 1383), Abbess of Birkenfeld and of Himmelkron.
 Adelheid, a nun in Birkenfeld from 1361 to 1370.

Ancestry

Burgraves of Nuremberg
Burials at Heilsbronn Abbey
1300s births
1357 deaths
Year of birth uncertain